Emirates Flight 407 was a scheduled international passenger flight operated by Emirates from Auckland to Dubai with a stopover in Melbourne, operated by an Airbus A340-500 aircraft. On 20 March 2009, the flight failed to take off properly at Melbourne Airport, hitting several structures at the end of the runway before climbing and then returning to the airport for a safe landing. Although no fatalities or injuries resulted, damage to the aircraft was severe enough for the event to be classified by Australian Transport Safety Bureau as an "accident". It was subsequently determined that a data-entry error  resulted in insufficient engine thrust during take off.  It has been described "as close as we have ever come to a major aviation catastrophe in Australia" by aviation officials.

Chronology
As the aircraft pitched upward, it failed to leave the ground and the tail section struck and continued to scrape along the runway. The captain took over the controls and applied maximum thrust on all four engines by using the takeoff/go-around detent. After exhausting the entire length of the runway, the aircraft failed to become airborne, and did not leave the ground until  beyond the end of the runway. The captain later said, "I thought we were going to die. It was that close".

Subsequently, the aircraft hit a strobe light at the end of the runway and continued to climb with difficulty. At  beyond the end of the runway, the landing gear hit and damaged the  localiser antenna array. At  beyond the end of the runway, the aircraft barely missed the  airport perimeter fence.

The aircraft eventually climbed away over Port Phillip Bay. The first officer then reviewed the takeoff performance calculations in his electronic flight bag, and discovered that he had understated the aircraft's weight by 100 tonnes (262.9 tonnes instead of 362.9). This meant that an incorrect flex temp was applied, which had resulted in a lower than necessary engine thrust and consequently insufficient acceleration and airspeed.

The pilots finished dumping fuel over the bay by 23:27, and they subsequently received a report of smoke in the cabin. They requested an immediate return, which air traffic control granted, and they returned to the airport at 23:36 without further incident.

Aircraft damage and repair
Despite having tailstrike protection built into the A340-500, the rear pressure bulkhead and the underlying structure were severely damaged during the take-off roll when the tail struck the runway with considerable force. The aircraft also suffered extensive damage to the bottom of the fuselage as it scraped along the runway, a large surface having been completely stripped off its external sheet.

The aircraft was not written off, but was instead returned to Airbus by way of a low-altitude flight without pressurisation routed from Melbourne to Toulouse on 19 June via Perth, Singapore, Dubai, and Cairo with the crew flying below .

The aircraft made its first revenue flight after repairs on 1 December 2009 as flight EK424, and remained in service operating short- to medium-haul international flights out of Dubai, until it was withdrawn from service in October 2014. It was scrapped later that year.

Aircrew
After being interviewed by investigators, the two pilots of the flight returned to Dubai. The captain and the first officer were asked to resign from Emirates upon their arrival in Dubai, and both did so.

The captain of Flight 407 had slept for only 6 hours during the 24 hours before the accident, while the first officer had had 8 hours of sleep in the same period. The captain had flown a total 99 hours during the prior month, 1 hour short of the maximum 100 flying hours allowed by Emirates, while the first officer had flown 90 hours in the same period.

Investigation
The accident investigation was performed by the Australian Transport Safety Bureau (ATSB). Central to the investigation was how the first officer had come to use the wrong aircraft weight, why that mistake was not picked up before takeoff, and why the flight crew had not realized the acceleration was much slower than expected until nearly entirely exhausting the  runway.

Studies showed that aircrew could have difficulty recognising that incorrect data had been entered in avionic equipment, resulting in poor take-off performance. The ATSB issued a safety recommendation to the United States Federal Aviation Administration and a safety advisory notice to the International Air Transport Association and the Flight Safety Foundation. In addition, Airbus investigated the development of software to help pilots recognise unusual or poor performance on take-off.

In October 2011, the ATSB released the findings of their investigation into the incident. They found that human error was the cause, and urged the development of technological aids that would alert pilots to incorrect data entry or insufficient take-off speed.

In response to the incident, Emirates reviewed its preflight procedures, mandating the duplication of laptop computers used for preflight planning so as to ensure dual data entry. They are also developing an avionics system for take-off acceleration-monitoring and alerting. Airbus updated its software to detect erroneous data. In October 2011, they announced plans to include a software program to calculate the required runway length. Furthermore, Airbus is developing a monitoring system to compute required acceleration rates and apply a "reasonableness test" to data input and alert the pilot to any potential errors.

In popular culture 
The events of the incident are documented in a series two episode of Aircrash Confidential, titled "Take-off".

Similar events
 On 22 May 2015, an Air France Boeing 777 operating cargo flight AF-6724 from Paris to Mexico City was involved in a serious incident when both captain and first officer independently entered an erroneous weight value of 243 tons rather than 343 tons into their electronic flight bags. The erroneously calculated performance data were subsequently entered into the flight management system. When the aircraft failed to lift off at the calculated speed, maximum (TOGA) power was applied and the aircraft became airborne and continued without further incident to its destination. The automatic tail-strike prevention system activated to limit the aircraft's pitch angle to avoid a tail strike.
 On 15 September 2015, Qatar Airways Flight 778, a Boeing 777-300ER registered A7-BAC, struck several approach lights immediately following takeoff from Miami on its way to Doha, tearing a  gash in the fuselage behind the rear cargo door. The flight continued on without incident for the remainder of the 13.5-hour flight duration. The pilots had mistakenly taken off from intersection T1 on runway 09, using only  of the full  runway length, after misreading information printed on their electronic flight bag.
 On 21 July 2017, a Sunwing Boeing 737 operating Thomson Airways flight BY-1526 with 6 crew and 179 passengers on board, struck a runway approach light immediately after takeoff from Belfast at the start of its flight to Corfu. The pilots had entered an incorrect outside air temperature into the aircraft's flight management computer, which caused it to use a lower thrust setting than required (81% N1, instead of 93%).

Notes

See also

 Pan Am Flight 845
 Air Florida Flight 90

References

External links
Australian Transport Safety Bureau Aviation Occurrence Investigation AO-2009-012 "Tailstrike and runway overrun - Airbus A340-541, A6-ERG, Melbourne Airport, Victoria, 20 March 2009"

Other external links
 

Aviation accidents and incidents in 2009
Aviation accidents and incidents in Victoria (Australia)
Melbourne Airport
2009 in Australia
Accidents and incidents involving the Airbus A340
2000s in Melbourne
Emirates (airline)
March 2009 events in Australia